La Mesa District is a district (distrito) of Veraguas Province in Panama. The population according to the 2000 census was 11,746; the latest official estimate (for 2019) is 12,052. The district covers a total area of 511 km2. The capital lies at the town of La Mesa.

Administrative divisions
La Mesa District is divided administratively into the following corregimientos:

La Mesa
Bisvalles
Boró
Llano Grande
San Bartolo
Los Milagros
El Higo

References

Districts of Panama
Veraguas Province